Aliyah O'Brien (born May 7, 1981) is a Canadian actress, best known for her television roles in the TV series Rookie Blue and Bates Motel and in the film Maximum Conviction.

Biography

Aliyah O'Brien was born in Victoria, British Columbia, and is of Irish, Spanish, and Welsh descent. She was actively involved in musical theatre while a student at Spectrum Secondary School. Her interest in kinesiology, however, led her to study it while attending Camosun College and landed her work as a personal trainer at Club Phoenix and the University of Victoria. Since graduation, she has traveled to 32 countries and describes herself as an "adrenaline junkie".

Filmography

Film

Television

References

External links
Aliyah O'Brien Official Site

1981 births
21st-century Canadian actresses
Actresses from Victoria, British Columbia
Canadian film actresses
Canadian television actresses
Canadian people of Irish descent
Canadian people of Spanish descent
Canadian people of Welsh descent
Living people
Camosun College alumni